Wild Blood is the fourth album by rock band Lovedrug. It was released on March 6, 2012.

The first two singles from the album were released as the split-single Pink Champagne / Dinosaur on September 6, 2011.  The music video for Dinosaur, written and directed by Michael Shepard, was premiered by Filter (magazine) the following week. The album was produced and engineered by Paul Moak at The Smoakstack.  The band toured extensively before and after the album release, performing over 50 dates in North American from February through May 2012, and including direct support from The Last Royals, Kingsfoil, and others.

Track listing

References

2012 albums
Lovedrug albums